Edinburghshire (also known as Midlothian) was a Scottish county constituency of the House of Commons of the Parliament of Great Britain (at Westminster) from 1708 to 1801 and of the Parliament of the United Kingdom (also at Westminster) from 1801 to 1918.

It elected one Member of Parliament (MP) by the first past the post system of election.

The seat is most famous as the location of William Ewart Gladstone's upset victory in the Midlothian Campaign of 1880, regarded as the birth of the modern political campaign in the United Kingdom. After Gladstone's victory it became the first non-English constituency to be represented by a serving prime minister.

Creation
The British parliamentary constituency was created in 1708 following the Acts of Union, 1707 and replaced the former Parliament of Scotland shire constituency of Edinburghshire.

Boundaries 

As first used, in the 1708 general election of the Parliament of Great Britain, the constituency covered the county of Edinburgh, except the burgh of Edinburgh, which was covered by the Edinburgh burgh constituency. 1708 boundaries were used also for all subsequent elections of that parliament.

In 1801 the Parliament of Ireland was merged with the Parliament of Great Britain to form the Parliament of the United Kingdom . The first general election of the new parliament was the general election of 1802. There was no change to the boundaries of any pre-existing Westminster constituency, and 1802 boundaries were used also in the general elections of 1806, 1807, 1812, 1818, 1820, 1826, 1830 and 1831.

For the 1832 general election, as a result of the Representation of the People Act 1832, the constituency was redefined. The boundaries of counties and burghs for parliamentary purposes ceased to be necessarily those for other purposes, but nominally the Edinburghshire constituency consisted of the county of Edinburgh minus the burghs of Edinburgh, Leith, Portobello, and Musselburgh. Edinburgh was again covered by the Edinburgh constituency, and Leith, Portobello and Musselburgh were covered by the Leith Burghs constituency.

1832 boundaries were used also in the general elections of 1835, 1837, 1841, 1847, 1852, 1857, 1859, 1865, 1874, 1880, 1886, 1892, 1895, 1900, 1906, January 1910 and December 1910.

For the 1918 general election, as a result of the Representation of the People Act 1918, the area of the Edinburghshire constituency was mostly divided between the Midlothian and Peebles Northern and Peebles and Southern Midlothian constituencies. By this date, the county of Edinburgh had been renamed as the county of Midlothian.

The Midlothian and Peebles Northern constituency consisted of the Calder and Suburban districts and part of the Lasswade district of the county of Midlothian, and the Peebles and Southern constituency consisted of the county of Peebles, the Gala Water district and part of the Lasswade district of county of Midlothian, and the burghs of Bonnyrigg, Lasswade, and Penicuik in county of Midlothian.

The rest of the county of Midlothian was covered by the Edinburgh Central, Edinburgh East, Edinburgh North, Edinburgh South, Edinburgh West and Leith constituencies.

History
The constituency elected one Member of Parliament (MP) by the first past the post system. There were 56 voters in 1708, 68 in 1710, about 80 between 1715 and 1754, 84 in 1764, 104 in 1774, 93 in 1788, 95 in 1790 rising to 123 in 1811, 174 in 1820, 168 in 1826 and 165 in 1830.
 The seat was redefined for the 1832 general election and replaced for the 1918 general election.

Members of Parliament

Election results

1830s

1840s

Ramsay resigned by accepting the office of Steward of the Chiltern Hundreds, causing a by-election.

1850s

Hope's death caused a by-election.

1860s

1870s

1880s

Gladstone's appointment as Prime Minister, First Lord of the Treasury and Chancellor of the Exchequer required a by-election.

Gladstone's appointment as Prime Minister, First Lord of the Treasury and Chancellor of the Exchequer required a by-election.

1890s

Gladstone's appointment as Prime Minister, First Lord of the Treasury and Lord Privy Seal required a by-election.

1900s

1910s

Notes and references 

Historic parliamentary constituencies in Scotland (Westminster)
Constituencies of the Parliament of the United Kingdom established in 1708
Constituencies of the Parliament of the United Kingdom disestablished in 1918
Constituencies of the Parliament of the United Kingdom represented by a sitting Prime Minister
History of Midlothian